The .416 Weatherby Magnum is a belted, bottlenecked cartridge designed by Ed Weatherby and launched commercially in 1989. It is a dangerous-game cartridge intended for the hunting of heavy dangerous game such as elephant and African Cape buffalo. Unlike earlier Weatherby cartridges which were designed by Roy Weatherby, this cartridge was designed by his son Ed Weatherby.

Beginning in the 1960s and through the 1970s, safari hunting in Africa was on the decline, and in turn demand for big-bore cartridges waned. Furthermore, the introduction of the .458 Winchester Magnum, which could be chambered in inexpensive rifles, further put a nail in the coffin of other big-bore cartridges such as the .416 Rigby, which required an oversized rifle action. Due to the lack of interest, ammunition manufacturers like Kynoch ceased operations.

However, by the 1980s, a renewed interest in safari hunting created a demand for big-bore dangerous-game cartridges. In 1988 Remington stepped up to the plate with their iteration of the .416 Hoffman, which was given the name .416 Remington Magnum. Unlike the Rigby, the Remington cartridge utilized the .375 H&H Magnum case and therefore, unlike the .416 Rigby, could be chambered in most firearm actions.

Taking advantage of this momentum, Weatherby introduced their own .416 cartridge in 1989; it was based on the .378 Weatherby Magnum cartridge, which was necked up to accept a  bullet.

Design
In traditional Weatherby fashion, a Weatherby cartridge would outclass similar-caliber cartridges with regard to the performance of the cartridge. To accomplish this task Weatherby relied on one of the largest commercial sporting cartridge cases available. The .416 Weatherby Magnum uses the same case as the .378 Weatherby Magnum and the .460 Weatherby Magnum. The case design was inspired by the .416 Rigby cartridge and features a belt and Weatherby’s signature double-radius venturi shoulder. Unlike the .416 Ruger and the .416 Remington, the .416 Weatherby Magnum requires an extra-large bolt face and large magnum action to contain the cartridge due to its oversized dimensions. Putting this in perspective, the .416 Weatherby Magnum has a case capacity of 140 gr. of water (9.09 cm3), an increase of 31% over that of the .416 Remington Magnum case.

The .416 Weatherby Magnum has been standardized by both the CIP and SAAMI. As with other Weatherby cartridges, there are discrepancies between SAAMI and CIP dimensions. This is arises from the CIP's treatment of the double-venturi case, shoulder and neck area of the cartridge. the CIP attempts to treat the shoulder as a conventional shoulder with transitional radius between each of the segments.

See also
 10 mm caliber
 List of rifle cartridges

References

Pistol and rifle cartridges
Magnum rifle cartridges
Weatherby Magnum rifle cartridges